The South African Guild of Actors is a representative body in South Africa that advocates for the interests of South African actors in the performing arts industry.

SAGA has a labour partner UASA, through whom it is represented within the Federation of Trade Unions FEDUSA. It is a member of the South African Screen Federation SASFED and is affiliated with the International Federation of Actors (FIA).

On 13 September 2018, made a presentation to the Portfolio Committee on Trade and Industry in the Parliament of South Africa in support of the Performers Protection Amendment Bill (2016). The previous year, on 4 August 2017, SAGA appealed to the Portfolio Committee on Trade and Industry against aspects of the proposed legislative review of the Copyright (Amendment) Bill 2014. Various other organisations, including The South African Freelancer's Organisation also stood in solidarity with this appeal.

In October 2013 the cast of South Africa’s longest-running soap Generations entered a protracted contractual dispute  with the public broadcaster, the SABC. When 16 cast members embarked on a so-called 'strike' barely a year later, the producer and broadcaster announced an indefinite hiatus in production. The cast were being advised by the defunct trade union CWUSA, while SAGA warned that the actors could be held in breach of contract as they were not protected by the Labour Laws. Ultimately the group of actors had their contracts terminated and the show was cancelled.

When South African television drama High Rollers was abruptly cancelled in 2016, SAGA voiced concern over South African producers' willingness to cancel production contracts before expiration.

When an actor fell to his death on 12 May 2018 while on a film set in the Drakensberg mountains in South Africa's KwaZulu-Natal province, SAGA initiated an investigation in collaboration with City Press.

SAGA has been vocal about the international issue around Sexual Harassment in the Entertainment Industry. The SWIFT (Sisters Working in Film and Television) campaign #ThatsNotOK  highlighting the plight of harassment has been endorsed and supported by SAGA. The collaboration of both organisations has brought about a Code of Conduct to be adopted by all industry professionals as well as addendum suggested for all actors and industry practitioners to sign in their contracts.

References 

Trade unions in South Africa